John Hood (fl. 1393–1399), of Leominster, Herefordshire, was an English politician.

His sons were also MPs: John and Thomas Hood.

He was a Member (MP) of the Parliament of England for Leominster in 1393 and 1399.

References

14th-century births
Year of death missing
English MPs 1393
People from Herefordshire
English MPs 1399